Sons of Freedom may refer to:

 Sons of Freedom (band), a Canadian alternative rock band in the 1990s
 Freedomites, a.k.a. Sons of Freedom, a now extinct Canadian Christian group and extremist movement from Russia
 Members of the political Freedom Party of British Columbia

See also
Sons of Liberty (disambiguation)